Gennady Sergeyevich Orlov (born 2 March 1945) is a Russian sports journalist and a former Soviet footballer. He has lived in Leningrad since 1966 and has been a commentator since 1974. Orlov is best known for being a football commentator on Leningrad Television and, subsequently, Petersburg – Channel 5 for many years.

See also
Football in Russia
List of football clubs in Russia

References

1945 births
Living people
Russian association football commentators
Soviet footballers
FC Zenit Saint Petersburg players
Russian journalists
National University of Kharkiv alumni
Russian sports journalists
Association football midfielders
FC Dynamo Saint Petersburg players